Ivisa Island is an uninhabited island in the Qikiqtaaluk Region of Nunavut, Canada. It is located in Baffin Island's Cumberland Sound. Imigen Island lies to its east, Saunik Island to its northeast. Aupaluktok Island, Ekallulik Island, Iglunga Island, the Kaigosuit Islands, and Kudjak Island are in the vicinity.

References

External links 
 Ivisa Island in the Atlas of Canada - Toporama; Natural Resources Canada

Islands of Baffin Island
Islands of Cumberland Sound
Uninhabited islands of Qikiqtaaluk Region